Ramon Berenguer II (Raymond Berengar) (c. 1135–1166) was the count of Provence from 1144 to his death. His uncle, Ramon Berenguer IV, Count of Barcelona, was the regent until 1157. 

In 1144, Ramon's father, Count Berenguer Ramon, died in an offensive against Genoa and he inherited the county. He was immediately opposed by the family of Baux and it took the military action of his uncle, the count of Barcelona, in 1147 to secure his throne. The war with the Baux continued until the count of Barcelona's death in 1162. 

In August 1161, he had travelled to Turin with his uncle obtain the confirmation of his countship in Provence from the Emperor Frederick I, for Provence was legally a fief of the Holy Roman Empire. There he met Richeza of Poland, the daughter of the exiled Polish high duke, Ladislaus II. He married her on 17 November and on the return journey, his uncle died. 

He resumed the war with Genoa, but died trying to take Nice in the spring of 1166. His daughter, Douce II, succeeded him, while widow Richeza was betrothed to Raymond V of Toulouse. 

Counts of Provence
Medieval child monarchs
1166 deaths
Year of birth unknown
House of Barcelona